The 2011 Pan American Games torch relay was a 50-day torch run, from August 26–October 14, 2011, held prior to the 2011 Pan American Games. Plans for the relay were originally announced July 6, 2011 by the Guadalajara Organizing Committee for the 2011 Pan American and Parapan American Games (COPAG). The relay brought the torch from Mexico City to the Estadio Omnilife for the Opening Ceremony. The flame arrived just in time for the opening ceremony.

The relay took the torch through all 32 Mexican states on a 50-day route starting on August 26, 2011, at the pyramids of Teotihuacan outside Mexico City. The Pan American flame was lit in the Pyramid of the Sun, the spot selected by the Pan American Sports Organization (PASO). The relay was organized by the Mexican Olympic Committee and was sponsored by Grupo Omnilife, a nutrition company. The first torch was carried by Pan American Games gold medalist Paola Longoria. The relay began with a moment of silence in honor of the victims of the 2011 Monterrey casino attack. About 3,500 runners carried the torch on the 15,000-kilometer route. The torch arrived in Puerto Vallarta on October 9, Ciudad Guzmán on October 11, Tapalpa on October 12, Lagos de Moreno on October 13 and Guadalajara on October 14 for the opening ceremony at the Estadio Omnilife.

The torch was designed by Vatti, the same company that designed the torch for the 2008 Summer Olympics. The design depicted green agave leaves with blue and white accents. The leaves surrounded and protected the flame.

Route

References

External links
Official website 

Torch
Pan American Games torch relays